Division No. 11 is one of eighteen census divisions in the province of Saskatchewan, Canada, as defined by Statistics Canada. It is located in the central part of the province and includes the largest city in the province, Saskatoon.

Demographics 

Census subdivisions 
The following census subdivisions (municipalities or municipal equivalents) are located within Saskatchewan's Division No. 11.

Cities
Martensville
Saskatoon
Warman

Towns

Allan
Colonsay
Dalmeny
Davidson
Dundurn
Govan
Hanley
Imperial
Langham
Lanigan
Nokomis
Osler
Outlook
Watrous

Villages

Bladworth
Bradwell
Broderick
Clavet
Drake
Duval
Elbow
Glenside
Kenaston
Liberty
Loreburn
Hawarden
Meacham
Plunkett
Simpson
Strongfield
Viscount
Young
Zelma

Resort villages
Etters Beach
Manitou Beach
Shields
Thode

Rural municipalities

 RM No. 250 Last Mountain Valley 
 RM No. 251 Big Arm 
 RM No. 252 Arm River 
 RM No. 253 Willner 
 RM No. 254 Loreburn 
 RM No. 280 Wreford 
 RM No. 281 Wood Creek 
 RM No. 282 McCraney 
 RM No. 283 Rosedale
 RM No. 284 Rudy
 RM No. 310 Usborne 
 RM No. 312 Morris
 RM No. 313 Lost River
 RM No. 314 Dundurn
 RM No. 340 Wolverine 
 RM No. 341 Viscount 
 RM No. 342 Colonsay 
 RM No. 343 Blucher 
 RM No. 344 Corman Park

Indian reserves
 Whitecap 94

See also 

List of census divisions of Saskatchewan
List of communities in Saskatchewan

References

Division No. 11, Saskatchewan Statistics Canada

 
11